Harish Singh Rawat (born 27 April 1948) is an Indian politician who served as the   Chief Minister of Uttarakhand from 2014 to 2017. A five-time Member of Parliament, Rawat is a senior leader of the Indian National Congress party. As a member of 15th Lok Sabha, Rawat served as Union Minister of Water Resources in the cabinet of Prime Minister Manmohan Singh from 2012 to 2014. He also worked as Minister of State at the Ministry of Parliamentary Affairs, Ministry of Agriculture, Ministry of Food Processing Industries (2011–2012) and Ministry of Labour and Employment (2009–2011).

Early life and education
Harish Rawat was born in a Kumaoni Rajput family in Mohnari village (Adbora Mohnari Graam Sabha), near Chaunalia (263680), Ranikhet in Almora district of the United Provinces (now Uttarakhand) on 27 April 1948  to Rajendra Singh Rawat and Devki Devi. He studied from GIC Chaunalia in his early days. He received a Bachelor of Arts and LL.B. from Lucknow University. He is married to his fellow Congress member and politician Renuka Rawat who also obtained Bachelor of Law from Lucknow University.

Early political career
Starting at village level politics, and after staying as a trade unionist and an Indian Youth Congress member for many years, he joined the Indian Parliament in 1980 as a member of the 7th Lok Sabha by defeating the BJP veteran Murli Manohar Joshi from Almora parliamentary constituency, followed by the 8th Lok Sabha and the 9th Lok Sabha. He has been head of Congress Volunteer Wing, Congress Seva Dal, since 1980. In 1981, he along with Subramanian Swamy and 13 others led first pilgrimage to Kailash–Manasarovar after 1962 Sino-Indian War.

Later years
In 2000, he was unanimously elected as President of  Uttarakhand Pradesh Congress Committee, and remained so until he was replaced by Yashpal Arya. In 2002, he was elected as a member of the Rajya Sabha, the upper house of Indian parliament.

In the 2009 general election, he left his traditional stronghold of Almora after it became a reserved seat post delimitation to contest from Haridwar, and won the election with over 3.3 Lakh of votes.

Chief Minister of Uttarakhand
In February 2014, Rawat took the oath of office as Chief Minister of Uttarakhand when Vijay Bahuguna resigned due to criticism of his handling of rehabilitation after June 2013 floods. In July 2014, he won a by-election from Dharchula assembly seat by over 19,000 votes.

On 18 March 2016, nine Congress MLAs rebelled against Rawat, reducing the Congress-led Government to a minority. The Union Government decided to impose President's Rule in the state, and the order was signed by President Pranab Mukherjee on 27 March 2016. He was later reinstated as Chief Minister on 11 May 2016 after winning the trust vote. On 11 March, Congress under the leadership of Harish Rawat lost the 2017 Assembly Elections to BJP. He was also defeated from the two seats (Haridwar Rural and Kichha) from which he contested.

Positions held

Electoral Performances

Lok Sabha

Uttarakhand Legislative Assembly

References

12. उत्तराखंड के मुख्यमंत्री ने प्रवासियों से कहा - घर लौट आओ प्लीज
http://www.uttarakhandnews.org/2015/02/uttarakhandchiefministerharishrawat_4.html

External links
Official website of CM of Uttarakhand
 

|-

|-

|-

|-

|-

|-

|-

1948 births
Living people
Indian National Congress politicians
People from Almora district
University of Lucknow alumni
Kumaoni people
India MPs 1980–1984
India MPs 1984–1989
India MPs 1989–1991
India MPs 2009–2014
Chief ministers from Indian National Congress
Lok Sabha members from Uttarakhand
Chief Ministers of Uttarakhand
Rajya Sabha members from Uttarakhand
Uttarakhand politicians
People from Haridwar district
Finance Ministers of Uttarakhand